Braceville Township may refer to:

Braceville Township, Grundy County, Illinois
Braceville Township, Trumbull County, Ohio

Township name disambiguation pages